Zdovc is a Slovenian surname. Notable people with the surname include:

Anja Zdovc (born 1987), Slovenian volleyball player
Jure Zdovc (born 1966), Slovenian basketball player and coach
Sonja Merljak Zdovc (born 1972), Slovenian journalist and writer

Slovene-language surnames